Homeothermy, homothermy or homoiothermy is thermoregulation that maintains a stable internal body temperature regardless of external influence. This internal body temperature is often, though not necessarily, higher than the immediate environment (from Greek ὅμοιος homoios "similar" and θέρμη thermē "heat"). Homeothermy is one of the three types of thermoregulation in warm-blooded animal species.  Homeothermy's opposite is poikilothermy. A poikilotherm is an organism that does not maintain a fixed internal temperature but rather fluctuates based on their environment and physical behaviour.

Homeotherms are not necessarily endothermic. Some homeotherms may maintain constant body temperatures through behavioral mechanisms alone, i.e., behavioral thermoregulation. Many reptiles use this strategy. For example, desert lizards are remarkable in that they maintain near-constant activity temperatures that are often within a degree or two of their lethal critical temperatures.

Evolution

Pros
Enzymes have a relatively narrow temperature range at which their efficiencies are optimal. Temperatures outside this range can greatly reduce the rate of a reaction or stop it altogether. A creature with a fairly constant body temperature can therefore specialize in enzymes which are efficient at that particular temperature. A poikilotherm must either operate well below optimum efficiency most of the time, migrate, hibernate or expend extra resources producing a wider range of enzymes to cover the wider range of body temperatures.

However, some environments offer much more consistent temperatures than others. For example, the tropics often have seasonal variations in temperature that are smaller than their diurnal variations. In addition, large bodies of water, such as the ocean and very large lakes, have moderate temperature variations. The waters below the ocean surface are particularly stable in temperature.

Cons
Because many homeothermic animals use enzymes that are specialized for a narrow range of body temperatures, hypothermia rapidly leads to torpor and then death.  Additionally, homeothermy obtained from endothermy is a high energy strategy and many environments will offer lower carrying capacity to these organisms. In cold weather the energy expenditure to maintain body temperature accelerates starvation and may lead to death.

See also
Gigantothermy
Warm-blooded

References

Animal physiology
Human homeostasis
Thermoregulation